.hack//Quantum is an animated three episode OVA series for the .hack franchise, produced by Kinema Citrus and presented by Bandai Visual. It was initially scheduled to be released in November 2010, but it was later changed. The first episode was released on January 28, 2011 with the following two episodes to be released in one month intervals. Excluding the all-CGI animation movie .hack//G.U. Trilogy, it is the first animated OVA project not to be produced by Bee Train. It is not related to a planned CGI movie tie-in to the newest game in the .hack series, .hack//Link. Masaki Tachibana of Tokyo Magnitude 8.0 directed the OVA project and .hack// writer Tatsuya Hamazaki scripted. Kinema Citrus animated the series and Kow Otani composed the music. Yuuka Nanri performed the theme song for the series. At Anime Weekend Atlanta 2011, Funimation announced that it had licensed the series and it was released on DVD and Blu-ray on February 14, 2012, making it the first in the franchise not to be licensed by Bandai Entertainment. The UK release was published by MVM Entertainment on July 9, 2012.

Story
In 2022, Sakuya, Tobias and Mary, play the latest version of the world's largest MMORPG: "The World R:X", created by Cyberconnect Corporation. As they take on a quest, they become caught in strange circumstances.

Characters
 / 

A high school student living in Aomori, who formed a party with three of her friends in "The World R:X". Her player character, Sakuya, is based on Kite. She says "Look before you jump", before charging off into dangerous places, and has a habit of picking up any items. Both Asumi and Sakuya share the same cheerful personality.

 / 

Asumi and Eri's schoolmate. Her player character, Tobias, is based on Balmung. Also known as "Tobias the Informant", she adventures with Sakuya with a pretty-boy look. She has a cool and calculating-nihilistic personality. In reality, Iori has an air of adulthood around her; and, unlike Tobias, she is not picky about clothes, choosing practical wear over what is in-style.

 / 

The schoolmate of both Asumi and Iori. Asumi is the one who got Eri into playing "The World". Her player character, Mary, is based on BlackRose. She adventures with Sakuya and Tobias. Her personality runs in contrast to the wild look of the Edge Punisher class. She would many times be misled into doing their task. In reality, she is much more serious than her in-game counterpart.

Episodes 
Pre-orders of the theatrical release on Amazon.co.jp and animate come with a bonus Original Drama CD.

Manga 
The series is serialized in Comp Ace as ".hack//Quantum+" (pronounced "Quantum Plus").
Another manga was released in March 2011, titled , and it was illustrated by SOGA Atsushi. The manga is a prologue to the events of the OVA series, and the first two chapters can be accessed freely in the Comic Gekkin website (owned by Bandai Visual). The third chapter was released on NTT DoCoMo phone. A printed version was released by Emotion Comics.

References

External links 

 Funimation's Official Site
 
 

Quantum
2010 anime OVAs
2011 manga
.hack Quantum
Bandai Visual
Funimation
Japan in fiction
Japanese webcomics
Kadokawa Shoten manga
Kinema Citrus
Massively multiplayer online role-playing games in fiction
OVAs based on video games
Seinen manga
Webcomics in print